Abhiraj Singh (born 27 May 1995) is a Singaporean cricketer. He played in the 2014 ICC World Cricket League Division Three tournament. He made his first-class debut on 28 March 2017 for Durham MCCU against Gloucestershire as part of the Marylebone Cricket Club University fixtures.

In August 2018, he was named in Singapore's squad for the 2018 Asia Cup Qualifier tournament. In October 2018, he was named in Singapore's squad for the 2018 ICC World Cricket League Division Three tournament in Oman.

References

External links
 

1995 births
Living people
Singaporean cricketers
Durham MCCU cricketers
Cricketers from Mumbai
Southeast Asian Games gold medalists for Singapore
Southeast Asian Games silver medalists for Singapore
Southeast Asian Games medalists in cricket
Competitors at the 2017 Southeast Asian Games
Indian emigrants to Singapore